Nansenia is a genus of pencil smelts.

Species
There are currently 18 recognized species in this genus:
 Nansenia ahlstromi Kawaguchi & J. L. Butler, 1984
 Nansenia antarctica Kawaguchi & J. L. Butler, 1984
 Nansenia ardesiaca D. S. Jordan & W. F. Thompson, 1914 (Robust smallmouth)
 Nansenia atlantica Blache & Rossignol, 1962
 Nansenia boreacrassicauda J. Y. Poulsen, 2015 (Northern fat-tail pencil smelt) 
 Nansenia candida Cohen, 1958 (Blue-throat argentine)
 Nansenia crassa Lavenberg, 1965 (Stout argentine)
 Nansenia groenlandica (J. C. H. Reinhardt, 1840) (Greenland argentine)
 Nansenia iberica Matallanas, 1985
 Nansenia indica Kobyliansky, 1992
 Nansenia longicauda Kawaguchi & J. L. Butler, 1984
 Nansenia macrolepis (Gilchrist, 1922)
 Nansenia megalopa Kawaguchi & J. L. Butler, 1984
 Nansenia oblita (Facciolà, 1887) (forgotten argentine, Mediterranean large-eyed argentine)
 Nansenia obscura Kobyliansky & S. G. Usachev, 1992
 Nansenia pelagica Kawaguchi & J. L. Butler, 1984
 Nansenia tenera Kawaguchi & J. L. Butler, 1984
 Nansenia tenuicauda Kawaguchi & J. L. Butler, 1984

References

Microstomatidae
Taxa named by David Starr Jordan
Taxa named by Barton Warren Evermann
Marine fish genera